Turner is a city in Marion County, Oregon, United States. The population was 2,454 at the 2020 census. It is part of the Salem Metropolitan Statistical Area. The community was incorporated by the Oregon Legislative Assembly on February 10, 1905.

Geography
Turner is situated near Mill Creek, a Tributary of Willamette.

Demographics

2010 census
As of the census of 2010, there were 1,854 people, 710 households, and 513 families living in the city. The racial makeup of the city was 93.2% White, 0.6% African American, 1.7% Native American, 0.5% Asian, 2.0% from other races, and 2.0% from two or more races. Hispanic or Latino of any race were 7.3% of the population.

There were 710 households, of which 33.1% had children under the age of 18 living with them, 57.6% were married couples living together, 8.9% had a female householder with no husband present, 5.8% had a male householder with no wife present, and 27.7% were non-families. 23.5% of all households were made up of individuals, and 15.3% had someone living alone who was 65 years of age or older. The average household size was 2.61 and the average family size was 3.07.

The median age in the city was 39 years. 25.5% of residents were under the age of 18; 7.1% were between the ages of 18 and 24; 24.8% were from 25 to 44; 24.4% were from 45 to 64; and 18.3% were 65 years of age or older. The gender makeup of the city was 48.1% male and 51.9% female.

2000 census
As of the census of 2000, there were 1,199 people, 491 households, and 330 families living in the city. The population density was 778.0 people per square mile (300.6/km). There were 522 housing units at an average density of 338.7 per square mile (130.9/km). The racial makeup of the city was 93.83% White, 0.08% African American, 1.67% Native American, 0.25% Asian, 2.00% from other races, and 2.17% from two or more races. Hispanic or Latino of any race were 4.34% of the population.

There were 491 households, out of which 27.1% had children under the age of 18 living with them, 56.8% were married couples living together, 7.1% had a female householder with no husband present, and 32.6% were non-families. 27.5% of all households were made up of individuals, and 20.0% had someone living alone who was 65 years of age or older. The average household size was 2.44 and the average family size was 2.99.

In the city, the population was spread out, with 23.8% under the age of 18, 7.4% from 18 to 24, 24.3% from 25 to 44, 22.4% from 45 to 64, and 22.1% who were 65 years of age or older. The median age was 41 years. For every 100 females, there were 92.8 males. For every 100 females age 18 and over, there were 88.5 males.

The median income for a household in the city was $36,250, and the median income for a family was $43,906. Males had a median income of $38,125 versus $23,636 for females. The per capita income for the city was $26,234. About 4.8% of families and 9.2% of the population were below the poverty line, including 9.8% of those under age 18 and 7.3% of those age 65 or over.

Education
Turner is serviced by the Cascade School District, which operates Cascade Senior High School, Cascade Junior High, and Three Elementary Schools.

Notable people
 Dean Cromwell (1879–1962), U.S. Olympic track and field coach, USC track and football coach
 Tyrell Williams (born 1992), Professional NFL football player, wide receiver, Las Vegas Raiders

See also
 Enchanted Forest

References

External links
 
 Entry for Turner in the Oregon Blue Book

 
Cities in Oregon
Cities in Marion County, Oregon
Salem, Oregon metropolitan area
1905 establishments in Oregon
Populated places established in 1905